Soma station is a station in Soma, Manisa, Turkey. Located in the northeastern part of the town, four daily trains, operated by TCDD Taşımacılık, stop at the station. The station was originally built by the Smyrna Cassaba Railway in 1890 and sold to the Turkish State Railways in 1934.

Pictures

References

External links
Station information
Station timetable

Railway stations in Manisa Province
Railway stations opened in 1890
1890 establishments in the Ottoman Empire
Transport in Manisa Province
Soma District